Jordan Luke (born in Australia) is an Australian rugby union player who plays for the  in the Super Rugby AU competition. His original playing position is wing. He was named in the Force squad for the Super Rugby AU competition in 2020.

Reference list

External links
Rugby.com.au profile
itsrugby.co.uk profile

Australian rugby union players
Living people
Rugby union wings
Year of birth missing (living people)
Perth Spirit players
Brisbane City (rugby union) players
Western Force players